

Available titles
The following is the complete list of the 7 Virtual Console titles available for the Nintendo 3DS in Taiwan and Hong Kong sorted by system and release date.

Game Boy
There are 4 games available to purchase.

Game Boy Color
There are 3 games available to purchase.

References

Video game lists by platform
Nintendo-related lists